John A. Lynch (October 11, 1882 – March 9, 1954) was an American businessman and politician from New York.

Life 
Lynch was born on October 11, 1882 in West New Brighton, Staten Island, New York.

Lynch initially apprenticed as a builder under his father. In 1903, at the age of 21, he began working in the insurance and real estate business and incorporated the John A. Lynch Company. In 1913, he was appointed commissioner of deeds. In 1914, he was elected the first vice-president of the West New Brighton Board of Trade. He remained active in his company, later known as the John A. Lynch Fire Insurance Company, until his death.

In 1918, Lynch was elected to the New York State Senate as a Democrat, representing New York's 24th State Senate district (Richmond and Rockland Counties). He served in the Senate in 1919 and 1920. He was a close friend and confidant of Matthew J. Cahill, and after then Richmond Borough President Cahill died in 1922, Lynch was appointed by the Richmond aldermen to succeed him as Borough President. He won the election for the office later that year, and was re-elected in 1925 and 1929. As Borough President, he worked to bring bridges and subways to Staten Island, and was instrumental in getting two bridges over the Arthur Kill built to connect Staten Island to New Jersey. He also spurred an extensive amount of construction and development in the borough, and oversaw industrial growth and a population boom. During the Seabury investigation, he was accused of committing an irregular business deal. Although the case against him blew over, in 1933 he lost the nomination for his re-election thanks to the efforts of Democratic leader David S. Rendt, a previously close associate he broke with in 1929. He ran as an independent but lost by a narrow margin to Republican Joseph A. Palma. He ran again for Borough President as a Democrat in 1945, but he lost to Cornelius A. Hall. In 1938, he worked as a stenographer for Queens Borough President George U. Harvey to qualify for a city pension.

Lynch was a member of the Elks and the New York Press Club. He was married to Grace McKee.

Lynch died at home on March 9, 1954. He was buried in the Moravian Cemetery.

References

External links 

 The Political Graveyard
 John A. Lynch at Find a Grave

1882 births
1954 deaths
People from West New Brighton, Staten Island
Staten Island borough presidents
American real estate brokers
American businesspeople in insurance
20th-century American businesspeople
Businesspeople from New York City
20th-century American politicians
Democratic Party New York (state) state senators
Burials at Moravian Cemetery